Isocentris seychellalis is a moth in the family Crambidae. It was described by Thomas Bainbrigge Fletcher in 1910. It is found on the Seychelles.

References

Moths described in 1910
Pyraustinae